Pope Mina of Alexandria may refer to:

 Pope Mina I of Alexandria, ruled in 767–775
 Pope Mina II of Alexandria, ruled in 956–974